Devarick Scandrett (born January 23, 1984) is a former American football defensive end for the Green Bay Packers of the NFL. He played college football for Middle Tennessee State University.

Career
In 2007, Scandrett signed with the Green Bay Packers.

References

External links
Devarick Scandrett player page at nfl.com

1984 births
Living people
American football defensive ends
Middle Tennessee Blue Raiders football players
Green Bay Packers players